Briza maxima is a species of the grass genus Briza. It is native to Northern Africa, Western Asia and Southern Europe and is cultivated or naturalised in the British Isles, the Azores, Australasia, the western United States, Central and South America, and Hawaii.

This species has a large number of common names, including big quaking grass, great quaking grass, greater quaking-grass, large quaking grass, blowfly grass, rattlesnake grass, shelly grass, rattle grass, and shell grass.

It grows to a height of 60 cm. The seeds and leaves are edible.

References

External links

Pooideae
Grasses of Africa
Grasses of Asia
Bunchgrasses of Europe
Plants described in 1753
Garden plants
Taxa named by Carl Linnaeus